The 2015 SEAT León Eurocup was the fifth season of the SEAT León Eurocup. The season was contested over seven race meetings – with two races at each meeting – starting on 25 April at the Paul Ricard Circuit and concluding on 1 November at the Circuit de Barcelona-Catalunya.

Reigning champion Pol Rosell defended his championship title for the Baporo Motorsport team. Rosell won four races and recorded eight podium finishes as he finished eleven points clear of his closest rival, Stian Paulsen. Paulsen went into the final race with a shot of winning the title, but his failure to score points sealed the title for Rosell. PCR Sport driver Mikel Azcona finished third in the championship, a further eleven points in arrears. Azcona won one race during the season; the season-opener at Paul Ricard.

Six other drivers won races during 2015; Fran Rueda won the partially reversed-grid races at Paul Ricard and Estoril, with single victories taken by Wolf-Power Racing's Jonny Cocker (Silverstone), Target Competition's Loris Hezemans (Red Bull Ring), Rosell's team-mate Alex Morgan (Nürburgring), while JSB Compétition team-mates Thibaut Mourgues and Lucile Cypriano won at Monza and Catalunya respectively.

Teams and drivers

Race calendar and results
All rounds were part of the International GT Open weekends, except for the Nürburgring event, which supported the Blancpain Endurance Series.

Championship standings

References

External links

SEAT León Eurocup seasons
SEAT Leon Eurocup
SEAT Leon Eurocup